Maarten Wynants (born 13 May 1982) is a Belgian former professional road bicycle racer, who rode professionally between 2005 and 2021 for the ,  and  teams. He now works as a directeur sportif for his final professional team, UCI WorldTeam .

Career
Born in Hasselt, Wynants was awarded the Combativity award, given to a rider judged to have showed exceptional attacking spirit during the race, following Stage 1 of the 2010 Tour de France on 4 July.

In June 2020, Wynants announced that he would retire from cycling in April 2021, after that year's Paris–Roubaix. Following the postponement of Paris–Roubaix to October due to the COVID-19 pandemic in France, Wynants' final race occurred at the Tour of Flanders.

Major results

2004
 1st  Road race, National Under-23 Road Championships
 10th Grand Prix de Waregem
2005
 3rd Hel van het Mergelland
2006
 1st Grote Prijs Beeckman-De Caluwé
 7th Overall Ster Elektrotoer
2007
 3rd Halle–Ingooigem
 5th Overall Ster Elektrotoer
 9th Overall Circuit Franco-Belge
 10th Overall Volta ao Algarve
2008
 3rd Trofeo Sóller
 5th Le Samyn
 6th Paris–Brussels
 6th Grand Prix de Fourmies
2010
  Combativity award Stage 1 Tour de France
2011
 7th Overall Tour of Belgium
2012
 3rd Overall Tour de l'Eurométropole
 7th Binche–Tournai–Binche
 8th Dwars door Vlaanderen
 10th Overall Tour of Belgium
 10th Paris–Roubaix
2013
 2nd Trofeo Platja de Muro
 9th Omloop Het Nieuwsblad
2014
 6th Kuurne–Brussels–Kuurne
2016
 9th Le Samyn
 9th Tour de l'Eurométropole
2017
 2nd Omloop van het Houtland
 3rd Omloop Mandel-Leie-Schelde
2018
 1st Stage 5 (TTT) Tour of Britain

Grand Tour general classification results timeline

References

External links

Belgian male cyclists
Sportspeople from Hasselt
Cyclists from Limburg (Belgium)
1982 births
Living people
European Games competitors for Belgium
Cyclists at the 2015 European Games
21st-century Belgian people